McCune is an unincorporated community in Pike County, in the U.S. state of Missouri.

The community is on Missouri Route U just west of the intersection with US Route 61. Peno Creek flows past about a quarter mile to the west. Bowling Green is six miles to the southeast on Route 61.

History
Variant names were "McCunes" and "McCune Station". A post office called McCunes Station was established in 1879, and remained in operation until 1920. The community has the name of John and William McCune, pioneer citizens.

References

Unincorporated communities in Pike County, Missouri
Unincorporated communities in Missouri